Caddo Parish (French: Paroisse de Caddo) is a parish located in the northwest corner of the U.S. state of Louisiana. According to the 2020 U.S. census, the parish had a population of 237,848. The parish seat is Shreveport, which developed along the Red River. 

The city of Shreveport is the economic and cultural center for the tri-state region of the Ark-La-Tex containing Caddo Parish. Caddo Parish is included in the Shreveport–Bossier City metropolitan statistical area.

History
In 1838, Caddo Parish was created by territory taken from Natchitoches Parish; the legislature named it for the indigenous Caddo Indians who had lived in the area. Most were forced out during Indian Removal in the 1830s.

With European-American development, the parish became a center of cotton plantations. Planters developed these along the waterways, with clearing and later cultivation and processing by thousands of enslaved African-American laborers. Shreveport, the parish seat, became a center of government, trade and law.

An armory was constructed in Shreveport before the American Civil War. This city served as the state capital after Union forces had seized Baton Rouge, Louisiana. Locals have referred to the armory as "Fort Humbug".

After the Civil War, and particularly after Reconstruction, whites in the parish used violence and intimidation against blacks to suppress Republican voting and re-establish white supremacy. The parishes in northwest Louisiana had a high rate of violence and lynchings. From 1877 through the early 20th century, there were 48 lynchings of African Americans in Caddo Parish; this was the second-highest total in the state after Lafourche Parish, and nearly twice as high as the lowest parishes among the top six. The victims included Jennie Steers, a domestic servant hanged by a white lynch mob in July 1903, for allegedly poisoning her employer's daughter.

In 1920 the Daughters of the Confederacy, who were memorializing the Civil War, designated the armory as "Fort Turnball". During World War II, the government used it as a mobilization site for men who had been drafted and recruited.

In the early twentieth century, the oil industry developed here, with a concentration of related businesses in Shreveport. Numerous oil wells were constructed across southern Arkansas and northern Louisiana.

Geography

Major highways
  Interstate 20
  Interstate 220
  Interstate 49
  U.S. Highway 71
  U.S. Highway 79
  U.S. Highway 80
  U.S. Highway 171

Adjacent counties and parishes

 Miller County, Arkansas (north)
 Lafayette County, Arkansas (northeast)
 Bossier Parish (east)
 Red River Parish (southeast)
 De Soto Parish (south)
 Panola County, Texas (southwest)
 Harrison County, Texas (west)
 Marion County, Texas (west)
 Cass County, Texas (northwest)

National protected area
 Red River National Wildlife Refuge (part)

Communities

City 
 Shreveport (parish seat and largest municipality)

Towns 
 Blanchard (suburb of Shreveport)
 Greenwood (suburb of Shreveport)
 Mooringsport
 Oil City
 Vivian

Villages 
 Belcher
 Gilliam
 Hosston
 Ida
 Rodessa

Unincorporated areas

Census-designated places 
 Lakeview (suburb of Shreveport)

Other unincorporated communities 
 Bethany (partly in Panola County, Texas)
 Conn
 Dixie
 Forbing
 Keithville (suburb of Shreveport)
 North Rodessa
 Zylks

Demographics

At the publication of the 2020 United States census, there were 237,848 people, 92,589 households, and 56,525 families residing in the parish. At the 2010 U.S. census, there were 254,969 people, 119,502 households, and 68,900 families residing in the parish. According to 2012 U.S. Census Bureau estimates, the Caddo Parish population was 257,093.

At the 2019 American Community Survey, the racial and ethnic makeup of the parish was 49.9% Black or African American, 44.3% non-Hispanic or Latino white, 0.4% Native American, 1.2% Asian, 0.2% Native Hawaiian and other Pacific Islander, 0.3% some other race, 1.8% two or more races, and 2.9% Hispanic or Latino American of any race. In 2010, the racial makeup of the parish was 49.1% White, 40.0% Black or African American, 1.2% Native American, 1.8% Asian, 0.1% Native Hawaiian and Pacific Islander, 0.82% from other races, and 1.8% from two or more races; 5.4% of the population were Hispanic or Latin American. Since the 2020 census, its Black or African American, and non-Hispanic white population have remained the predominant groups though Hispanic or Latino Americans rebounded to comprising 3.52% of the population; multiracial Americans also increased to forming 3.69% of the population. Reflecting nationwide trends of greater diversification since the 2020 U.S. census, the Asian American community saw increases among its population as well.

In 2010, there were 119,502 households, out of which 30.90% had children under the age of 18 living with them, 42.20% were married couples living together, 19.80% had a female householder with no husband present, and 33.70% were non-families. A total of 28.90% of all households were made up of individuals, and 10.50% had someone living alone who was 65 years of age or older. The average household size was 2.51 and the average family size was 3.11. In 2019, there were 92,589 households spread throughout 113,578 housing units; 59.8% of housing units were owner-occupied. The median gross rent was $810. By 2021, the median sales price for a single-family household was $207,000.

At the 2010 census, the parish population was spread out, with 26.80% under the age of 18, 10.20% from 18 to 24, 27.40% from 25 to 44, 22.00% from 45 to 64, and 13.70% who were 65 years of age or older. The median age was 35 years. For every 100 females there were 89.70 males. For every 100 females age 18 and over, there were 84.90 males. At the 2019 American Community Survey, 76.1% were aged 18 and older, and 6.8% of the population were age 5 and under. The median age was 38.8, though 2020 estimates determined the median age declined to 37.8 with a ratio of 89.9 males per 100 females.

Economy

The economy of the parish is primarily centered in the city of Shreveport, with international corporations including Amazon and Walmart stimulating the economy alongside nationwide chains such as Best Buy, Target, and others. While maintaining these companies in the parish, however, Caddo includes some of the poorest areas in Louisiana by ZIP code. Statistics from 2014 show West Shreveport (71103) was the poorest ZIP code in the state with a per capita income of just $22,267; Queensborough, Shreveport (71109) was the fourth-poorest with $24,966; Caddo Heights/South Highlands (71108) was the fifth-poorest with $25,334; and Rodessa (71069) was the twenty-fourth-poorest with $34,346. In 2020, an estimated 22.9% of the parish population lived at or below the poverty line with 33.9% of its impoverished population being under 18 years of age.

Parishwide, the median household income was $42,003 as of 2020's American Community Survey; families had a median income of $55,719; married-couple families $81,114; and nonfamily households $26,204. Despite the poverty within the parish, however, the Shreveport–Bossier City metropolitan statistical area and entire Northwest Louisiana region gained three projects valued at over $750 million dollars in the early 2020s to offset its population and economic decline, and increase recognition.

The largest employers in the region as of 2017 were:

Law and government
As parish seat, Shreveport is the site of the parish courthouse. Caddo Parish comprises the 1st Judicial District. Located downtown on Texas Street, the courthouse contains both civil and criminal courts. The current elected judges are: Ramon Lafitte, Craig O. Marcotte, Michael A. Pitman, Karelia R. Stewart, Robert P. Waddell, Erin Leigh W. Garrett, Katherine C. Dorroh, John Mosely, Jr., Brady O'Callaghan, Ramona Emanuel, Charles G. Tutt, and Roy Brun. The Clerk of Court is Mike Spence. Caddo Parish like all parishes in Louisiana utilizes Justices of the Peace and Constables particularly when civil suits below $5,000 or an eviction has been filed.

Politics
Since the late 20th century, most conservative whites in Louisiana have shifted into the Republican Party. Politics largely follows ethnic patterns, as most African Americans have supported national Democratic candidates since regaining the power to vote and other civil rights under Democratic national administrations. Some urban liberal whites also vote Democratic. Since 1980, Caddo Parish has voted for the overall national popular vote winner in presidential campaigns. Notably the city of Shreveport is the base for Democratic strength, while surrounding white-majority suburban areas are aligned with the Republican Party.

In the 2004 presidential election, Republican George W. Bush won Caddo Parish. He received 51% of the vote and 54,292 votes. Democrat John F. Kerry received 48% of the vote and 51,739 votes.

In 2008, Democrat Barack Obama won 51% of the vote and 55,536 votes in the parish. John McCain trailed with 48% and 52,228 votes. Other candidates received about 1% of the vote. McCain carried the state of Louisiana.

In the U.S. Senate election in 2008, Democrat Mary Landrieu, who survived a hard challenge from Republican John Neely Kennedy, received 58% of the vote in Caddo Parish and 60,558 votes. John Kennedy won 40% of the vote and 41,348 votes. Other candidates received 2% of the vote. In the 2016 U.S. Senate election, Republican John Neely Kennedy defeated Democrat Foster Campbell in Caddo Parish. Kennedy also won the general statewide election, giving Louisiana two Republican senators.

Caddo Parish hasn't voted for a popular vote loser since 1976, tied for the longest streak in the country with St. Joseph County, Indiana, and Rockland County, New York. In 2000 and 2016, Caddo Parish voted for Al Gore and Hillary Clinton, respectively, both of whom won the popular vote but lost the electoral college. The longest bellwether county for electoral college victors is Clallam County, Washington.

Education
The Caddo Parish School Board operates public schools.

The parish also has fourteen private schools as of 2018. It is in the service area of Bossier Parish Community College, though the private Centenary College of Louisiana and LSU's Shreveport campus are also prominent institutions of higher education.

Correction center
The Louisiana Department of Public Safety & Corrections operated the Forcht-Wade Correctional Center in Keithville, an unincorporated section of Caddo Parish. As the state succeeded in reducing the number of prisoners, it closed this facility in July 2012.

The Caddo Correctional Center is a full-service parish jail rated at a capacity of 1,500 beds. Constructed in 1994, this facility was designed to successfully manage a large number of inmates with a minimum of personnel. The Caddo Correctional Center is the largest jail in the Ark-La-Tex and the only "direct supervision" facility in the state.

See also 

 National Register of Historic Places listings in Caddo Parish, Louisiana
 USS Caddo Parish (LST-515)
 Jasper K. Smith, former member of the Louisiana House of Representatives 1944–1948 and 1952–1964, and former city attorney of Vivian

References

External links
 Caddo Parish government's website

 
Louisiana parishes
Louisiana placenames of Native American origin
Parishes in Shreveport – Bossier City metropolitan area
Geography of Shreveport, Louisiana
1838 establishments in Louisiana
Populated places established in 1838
Majority-minority parishes in Louisiana